Valamon Viiniherman Oy ("Valamo Wine Herman") is a company, whose main owner is the Valamo Monastery in Finland. It was founded in 1997, and its main field of operations, according to the Finnish Trade Register, is the distilling and mixing of alcoholic beverages and production of ethanol through fermentation.

The company was founded by the Valamo Monastery and a winery called Hermannin viinitila ("Hermann's Wine Estate") from Ilomantsi. The latter is the oldest wine estate in Finland, having been founded in 1989.

In 2013 Valamo owned half of Valamon Viiniherman. The company produces wines, liqueurs and in the future, also whisky.

The company is said to be the creation of Father Andreas of the monastery. It made €60 000 in profits in 2012.

In 2014 it was announced that the company will begin to produce whisky. The monastery plans to make whisky the foundation of their economy. The initial investment amounts to ca. one million euros. The company believes the operation will be a profitable one, even though they will not be able to sell their whisky until 2018. The distillery needed in the project forms a company of its own, and the majority of the shares is owned by the monastery. The person responsible for the production of alcoholic beverages in the monastery is Timo Kettunen.

External links

References

Distilleries
Drink companies of Finland
Food and drink companies established in 1997